This is a list of people commemorated on postage stamps of Pakistan

 

 Bahawalpur

A
 A. K. Fazlul Huq, 'Pioneers of Freedom' stamp series (1990)
 Abdul Sattar Edhi, 'Social Welfare Icon, Great Humanitarian' postage stamp series (2016) 
 Professor A. B. A. Haleem, Vice-Chancellor, University of Sindh (1947-51), then Vice-Chancellor at University of Karachi (1951-1957), 'Men of Letters' stamp series (2003)
 Abdul Qayyum Khan (16 July 1901-22 October 1981), political leader of North-West Frontier Province now called Khyber Pakhtunkhwa, 'Pioneers of Freedom' postage stamp series (1990)
 Sir Abdullah Haroon, 'Pioneers of Freedom' stamp series (1990)  
 Abdul Qadir (Muslim leader) or [Sir Sheikh Abdul Qadir (1874-1950)] 'Pioneers of Freedom' commemorative postage stamp series (1994)
 Abdus Salam, Nobel Laureate and physicist (1998)
 Abu Raihan Mohammad Ibn-Ahmad, al-Biruni, astronomer (1973)
 Abul Asar Hafeez Jalandhri (1900–82), poet who penned Pakistan's Qaumi Tarana (national anthem) (2001)
 Sir Adamjee Haji Dawood, (30 June 1880-27 January 1948), industrialist and philanthropist, 'Pioneers of Freedom' postage stamp series (1999)
 Dr. Mohammad Afzal Hussain Qadri, scientist (1912–74) (1999)
 Aga Khan III, (spiritual leader of the Ismailies) 'Pioneers of Freedom' stamp series (1977, 1990)
 Professor Ahmed Ali (1910–94)- (Writer, Educationist), 'Men of Letters' stamp series (2005)
 Ahmed E. H. Jaffer (1909–90), 'Pioneers of Freedom' series (2000)
 Ahmad Nadeem Qasmi (1916–2006), (poet, journalist and writer), 'Men of Letters' postage stamp series issued in 2009 on his 3rd death anniversary
 Ahmed Pervez, painter artist (1926–79), 'Painters of Pakistan' stamp series (2006)
 Akhtar Shairani (1905-1948) (poet), 'Poets of Pakistan' series stamps (2005)
 Albert Schweitzer, medical doctor (1975)
 Al-Biruni (973-1048)-scholar (1973)
 Alexander Graham Bell, inventor (1976)
 Ali Imam (painter artist), painter artist (1924–2002), 'Painters of Pakistan' stamp series (2006)
 Allama Abdullah Yusuf Ali (1872-1953)-religious scholar and Quran translator into English (1996)
 Allama Mohammad Iqbal, poet and philosopher 'Pioneers of Freedom' postage stamp series (1967, 1974, 1975, 1977, 1990, 1997, 2002, 2005)
 Maulana Altaf Hussain Hali, Urdu poet and writer 'Pioneers of Freedom' postage stamp series (1979)
 Amir Khusrau, (1253-1325) master musician and inventor of new musical instruments (1975)
 Amir Timur, Central Asian ruler (1997)
 Anna Molka Ahmed, painter artist (1917–94), 'Painters of Pakistan' stamp series (2006)
 Armauer Hansen, medical researcher (1973)
 Asifa Bhutto Zardari, daughter of Benazir Bhutto (2009)
 Askari Mian Irani, painter artist (1940–2004), 'Painters of Pakistan' stamp series (2006)

B
 Baba Farid also known as Fariduddin Ganjshakar, (12th and 13th century Sufi from the Punjab - lived during Ghauri to Balban ruling periods) (800th Birth Anniversary of Baba Farid -  postage stamp series (1989)
 Sultan Bahoo (Sufi) Commemorative postage stamp series (1991)
 Bashir Mirza, painter artist (1941–2000), 'Painters of Pakistan' postage stamp series (2006)
 Benazir Bhutto, Prime Minister (1995, 2008, 2009)
 Abadi Bano Begum (affectionately known as Bi Amma, mother of Maulana Mohammad Ali Jauhar, 'Pioneers of Freedom' stamp series  (1990)
 Burhan Wani (1994 - 2016) (Kashmiri freedom fighter) commemorative postage stamp issued (2018)
 Maulana Abdul Hamid Qadri Badayuni (1898 - 1970) 'Pioneers of Freedom' stamp series (1999)

C
 Chaudhry Khaliquzzaman, 'Pioneers of Freedom' stamp series (1990)
 Chaudhry Ghulam Abbas 'Pioneers of Freedom' stamp series (1995)
 Chaudhry Muhammad Ali (1905-1980) 'Pioneers of Freedom' stamp series (1999)
 Choudhary Rehmat Ali, he is widely credited for coining the new country name "Pakistan" before its independence- 'Pioneers of Freedom' stamp series (1990)
 Copernicus, Polish astronomer (1973)

D

E

F
 Faiz Ahmed Faiz, 'Poets of Pakistan' stamp series (1997)
 Farah Pahlavi, Iranian empress (1967)
 Mohtarma Fatima Jinnah 'Pioneers of Freedom' stamp series (1990, 1997, 2003)

G
 Sir Ghulam Hussain Hidayatullah, 1st Governor of Sindh after independence in 1947, 'Pioneers of Freedom' stamp series (1990)
 Ghulam Bari Aleeg (1907–49), 'Men of Letters' stamp series (1999)

H
 Habib Ibrahim Rahimtoola, Tehreek-e-Pakistan Key Mujahid 'Pioneers of Freedom' stamp series (2002)
 Haji Muhammad Sharif  (painter artist) (1990)
 Hakim Abdul Qasim Firdousi; penned "Shahnama" during the 10th century (1994)
 Hakim Muhammad Hassan Qarshi (Hakim; founder of Qarshi Dawakhana) (2002)
 Hakim Mohammad Said, (1920-1998) (physician, writer, scholar) founded Hamdard Dawa Khana, stamp issued on his first death anniversary (1999)
 Hameed Nizami, (Journalist) 'Pioneers of Freedom' stamp series (1991)
 Hassan Ali Effendi (1830 – 1895) (founder of Sindh Madrasatul Islam in 1885) 'Pioneers of Freedom' postage stamp series (1990)
 Heinrich von Stephan (1981)
 Henri Dunant (1978)
 Hugh Catchpole, educationist (2007)
 Hussein Shaheed Suhrawardy Prime Minister of Pakistan, 'Pioneers of Freedom' stamp series (1990)
 King Hussein of Jordan (1971)

I
 Abol Hassan Ispahani 'Pioneers of Freedom' stamp series (1990)
 Ibrahim Ismail Chundrigar, Prime Minister of Pakistan in 1957, 'Pioneers of Freedom' stamp series (2002)
 Imran Khan, Pakistani cricketer (1992)
 Ishtiaq Hussain Qureshi (1903-1981) (educationist/historian), 'Men of Letters' stamp series (2001)
 Ishfaq Ahmed (writer, scholar) 'Men of Letters' stamp series (2013)
 Ibn-e-Insha (poet) 'Men of Letters' stamp series (2013)

J
 Jalaluddin Rumi, 13th-century poet (1997)
 Jam Mir Ghulam Qadir Khan (1994)
 Jamshed Nusserwanjee Mehta, 1st Mayor of Karachi (1988)
 Begum Jahanara Shahnawaz 'Pioneers of Freedom' stamp series (1990)
 Josh Malihabadi (1899-1982), 'Poets of Pakistan' (1999)

K
 Kazi Nazrul Islam, Bengali poet and composer (1968)
 Khawaja Ghulam Farid, Saraiki Sufi poetry, 'Poets of Pakistan' postage stamp series (2001)
 Khawaja Nazimuddin Prime Minister of Pakistan, 'Pioneers of Freedom' stamp series (1990)
 Khawaja Sarwar Hasan (1902–73), writer (2005)
 Khushal Khan Khattak, Pashto poet (1995)
 Joginder Nath Mandal, 'Pioneers of Freedom' stamp series

L
 Laila Shahzada, painter artist (1926–94), 'Painters of Pakistan' stamp series (2006)
 Liaquat Ali Khan (Prime Minister from 1947–51), 'Pioneers of Freedom' stamps issued in (1974, 1990, 1995, 1997)
 Louis Pasteur (scientist) (1995)
 Lutfullah Khan (1916 – 2012) (Pakistan's eminent music and literature "Archivist")

M
 Malik Barkat Ali (1 April 1886 – 5 April 1946) 'Pioneers of Freedom' postage stamp series (1990)
 Mao Zedong Chinese leader (1999)
 Maria Montessori, educator (1970)
 Maulana Shibli Nomani (1857-1914) 'Pioneers of Freedom' stamp series (1992)
 Maulana Mohammad Ali Jauhar (1878-1931) 'Pioneers of Freedom' stamp series (1978)
 Maulana Shaukat Ali 'Pioneers of Freedom' postage stamp series (1995)
 Maulana Zafar Ali Khan, journalist and scholar, 'Pioneers of Freedom' postage stamp series
 Maulana Abdul Sattar Khan Niazi (1915 - 2001), (Pakistan Movement) 'Tehrik-e-Pakistan Ke Mujjahid' stamp series (2003)
 Maulana Muhammad Ismail Zabeeh (1913 - 2001), (Pakistan Movement) 'Tehrik-e-Pakistan Ke Mujahid' stamp series (2003)
 Maulvi Abdul Haq, Baba-e-Urdu, (20 April 1870-16 August 1961), (writer, linguist) 'Men of Letters' postage stamp series (2004)
 Mihai Eminescu, Romanian poet (2005)
 Mir Ahmad Yar Khan, Khan of Kalat 'Pioneers of Freedom' postage stamp series (1993)
 Mir Jafar Khan Jamali 'Pioneers of Freedom' postage stamp series (2007)
 Mirza Asadullah Khan Mirza Ghalib, 19th-century poet (1969, 1998)
 Mohamedali Habib, philanthropist (2000)
 Mohammad Abdul Latif, also known as 'Pir Sahib Zakori Sharif' 'Pioneers of Freedom' postage stamp series  (1993) 
 Mohammad Ali Jinnah, Founder of Pakistan, 1st Governor-General, stamps issued (1966, 1972, 1973, 1976, 1989, 1990, 1992, 1994, 1997, 1998, 2001, 2004, 2005, 2006)
 Mohammad Aly Rangoonwala (1924–98), philanthropist (2002)
 Mohammad Ayub Khan, President of Pakistan (1958-1966)
 Muhammad Ayub Khuhro (1997)
 Lance Naik Muhammad Mahfuz Shaheed (1944–71); Recipient, Nishan-e-Haider Award (2002)
 Shah Mohammad Reza Pahlavi (1967, 1976)
 Dr. Muhammad Afzal Hussain Qadri (1912–74), scientist (1999)
 Major Muhammad Akram Shaheed, Recipient, Nishan-e-Haider Award (2001)
 Muhammad Aly Rangoonwala, philanthropist (2002)
 Muhammad Yousaf Khan Khattak, Tehreek-e-Pakistan key Mujahid (2003)
 Captain Muhammad Sarwar Shaheed, Recipient of Nishan-e-Haider Award (2000)
 Musa Pak Shaheed, Muslim saint (2009)
 Mustafa Kemal Atatürk, President of Turkey (1973, 1976, 1981, 2005)
 Muhammad Zia-ul-Haq, President of Pakistan (5 July 1977 – 17 August 1988)
 Justice Muhammad Karam Shah al-Azhari (1918–98), 'Men of Letters' series commemorative postage stamp issued in (2004)

N
 Nawab Bahadur Yar Jung (1905-1944) 'Pioneers of Freedom' stamp series (1990)
 Nawab Sir Shahnawaz Khan Mamdot, 'Pioneer of Freedom' stamp series (1990)
 Nawab Iftikhar Hussain Khan Mamdot, 'Pioneers of Freedom' postage stamp series (1992)
 Nawab Mohammad Ismail Khan 'Pioneers of Freedom' stamp series(1990)
 Nawab Mohsin-ul-Mulk (1837-1907) 'Pioneers of Freedom' stamp series (1994)
 Nawab Salimullah 'Pioneers of Freedom' stamp series (1990)
 Nawab Sadeq Mohammad Khan V, ruler of Bahawalpur State (2004)
 Nawab Viqar-ul-Mulk (1841-1917) 'Pioneers of Freedom' stamp series (1994)
 Nusrat Fateh Ali Khan (1948–97), Qawwal, Music Maestro, commemorative postage stamp issued in 1999

O

P
 Patras Bokhari (Syed Ahmad Shah), writer, educationist and UN diplomat 'Men of Letters' postage stamp series (1998)
 Pierre De Coubertin, Founder of Modern Olympics, (1996)
 Pir Ilahi Bux 'Pioneers of Freedom' postage stamp series (1994)
 Pir Mohammad Abdul Latif (Pir Sahib Zakori Sharif) 'Pioneers of Freedom' postage stamps series (1993)
 Pir of Manki Sharif 'Pioneers of Freedom' postage stamp series (1990)
 Pir Meher Ali Shah (1859-1937), Sufi saint series (2013)

Q
 Qazi Muhammad Essa, 'Pioneers of Freedom' postage stamp series (1990)
 Qazi Mureed Ahmed, Pakistan Movement activist (2002)
 Qudrat Ullah Shahab, 'Men of Letters' postage stamp series (2013) - Pakistani civil servant and writer

R
 Begum Ra'ana Liaquat Ali Khan, wife of 1st Prime Minister; founded APWA, stamps issued (1991, 2006)
 Rais Ghulam Muhammad Khan Bhurgri (1990)
 Raja Ghazanfar Ali Khan 'Pioneers of Freedom' postage stamp series (1990)
 Major Raja Aziz Bhatti, Recipient of Nishan-e-Haider Award (1995)
 Raja Sahib Mahmudabad 'Pioneers of Freedom' postage stamp series (1990)
 Rashid Minhas (Shaheed), Recipient of Nishan-e-Haider Award for war service (2003)
 Rehman Baba, poet (2005)

S
 Saadat Hasan Manto(1912–55), "Afsana Nigar" (short story writer), 'Men of Letters' postage stamp series (2005)
 Sadequain, painter artist (1930–87) (2006)
 Dr. Salimuzzaman Siddiqui, scientist (1999)
 Begum Salma Tassaduq Hussain (1997)
 Samandar Khan Samandar, poet (2002)
 Sardar Abdur Rab Nishtar 'Pioneers of Freedom' stamp series (1990)
 Sardar Aurangzeb Khan (1994)
 Sawar Muhammad Hussain Shaheed, (1949–71), Recipient, Nishan-e-Haider Award (2002)
 Allama Shabbir Ahmad Usmani (1887-1949) 'Pioneers of Freedom' stamp series (1990)
 Major Shabbir Sharif Shaheed, (1943–71) Recipient, Nishan-e-Haider Award (2001)
 Shah Nawaz Bhutto, (1888-1957), father of Zulfiqar Ali Bhutto 'Pioneers of Freedom' stamp series (1994)
 Shakir Ali (1916–75), painter-artist, 'Painters of Pakistan' stamp series (1990, 2006)
 Justice Shaykh Muhammad Karam Shah al-Azhari, postage stamp issued in (2004)
 Khalifa bin Zayed bin Sultan Al-Nahyan, ruler of Abu Dhabi and president of UAE (2001)
 Sher Shah Suri, Emperor of 16th century India (1991)
 Sir Nawazish Tawab (famous entrepreneur, poet, writer)
 Sir Syed Ahmed Khan (1817-1898) 'Pioneers of Freedom' stamp series ((1979, 1990, 1998)
 Syed Sulaiman Nadvi, (historian, scholar) 'Pioneers of Freedom' postage stamp series  (1992)
 Syed Ameer Ali, (1849 – 1928) Muslim scholar, 'Pioneers of Freedom' stamp series (1990)
 Syed Imtiaz Ali Taj (1900–70), (playwright, novelist) 'Men of Letters' postage stamp series (2001)
 Sufi Barkat Ali (1911 – 1997) (Sufi and writer) 'Men of Letters' postage stamp series (2013)

T
 Tansu Çiller, Prime Minister of Turkey (1995)
 Tipu Sultan, 18th-century ruler of Mysore, South India 'Pioneers of Freedom' postage stamp series (1979)
 Major Tufail Mohammad Shaheed, recipient of Nishan-e-Haider Award (2000)

U
 Ubaidullah Sindhi (1872-1944) 'Pioneers of Freedom' stamp series (1990)
 Ustad Allah Bakhsh, painter-artist, 'Painters of Pakistan' stamp series (1991)
 Ustad Mohammad Sharif, painter-artist, 'Painters of Pakistan' stamp series (1991)

V

W

X

Y
 Yusuf Khattak (1917 – 29 July 1991) Pakistan Movement 'Key Mujahid' postage stamp series (2003)

Z
 Dr. Ziauddin Ahmed 'Pioneers of Freedom' stamp series (1994)
 Zahoor ul Akhlaq, painter artist (1941–99) (2006)
 Zubeida Agha, painter artist (1922–97), 'Painters of Pakistan' stamp series (2006)
 Zulfikar Ali Bhutto, (President, Prime Minister, 1972-1977) (stamps issued in 1989, 1996, 2008)
 Mohammad Zia ul-Haq, (President, 1977-1988)

Bahawalpur
 Amir Muhammad Bahawal Khan I Abbasi (1947)
 Mohammad Ali Jinnah (1948)

See also
 Pakistan Postal Services

References

External links
 Pakistan Post Official Site

Pakistan
People
Stamps